Taiteccopsis is a genus of moths belonging to the subfamily Olethreutinae of the family Tortricidae.

Species
Taiteccopsis davisorum Razowski, 2013
Taiteccopsis taitana Razowski, 2012

See also
List of Tortricidae genera

References

 , 2012: Tortricidae from the Tervuren Museum, 2: Olethreutini (Insecta: Lepidoptera). Genus 23 (1): 163-182. Full article: .
 

Olethreutini
Moth genera